Great River Road State Park is a public recreation area in the U.S. state of Mississippi located off Mississippi Highway 1 in the southwest corner of the city of Rosedale.

Activities and amenities
The state park features boating and fishing on  Perry Martin Lake as well as picnicking facilities and a playground. The park's  lookout tower which offered views of the Mississippi River was taken down following the damaging floods of 2011.

References

External links

Great River Road State Park Mississippi Department of Wildlife, Fisheries, and Parks

State parks of Mississippi
Protected areas of Bolivar County, Mississippi
Protected areas on the Mississippi River